Cẩm Giàng may refer to several locations in Vietnam:

 Cẩm Giàng, Bắc Kạn
 Cẩm Giàng District